Robert Speakman (born 5 December 1980) is an English former footballer who played in the Football League for Exeter City.

External links

Welsh footballers
English Football League players
Exeter City F.C. players
1980 births
Living people
Association football forwards